Chuck (released as The Bleeder in the UK and Ireland) is a 2016 American biographical sports drama film directed by Philippe Falardeau and written by Jeff Feuerzeig, Jerry Stahl, Michael Cristofer and Liev Schreiber, who also stars in the title role. The cast includes Elisabeth Moss, Ron Perlman, Naomi Watts, Jim Gaffigan, Michael Rapaport, Pooch Hall, Morgan Spector, Jason Jones and Catherine Corcoran. The film depicts the life of heavyweight boxer Chuck Wepner and his 1975 title fight with the heavyweight champion, Muhammad Ali, which inspired Sylvester Stallone's character and screenplay for the 1976 film Rocky.

Principal photography began on October 26, 2015 in Suffern, New York. Chuck received its world premiere at the 2016 Venice Film Festival on September 2, 2016. It was released May 5, 2017, by IFC Films.

Plot 
Chuck Wepner, known as the 'Bayonne Bleeder', is a heavyweight boxer known for his iron chin and reckless behaviour. He lives with his second wife Phyllis and daughter Kimberly in New Jersey. By 1974, he was rising up the boxing ranks hopeful for an eventual fight with the champion George Foreman, defeating Terry 'the Storming Mormon' Hinke in the process. Chuck's trainer and manager Al Braverman receives a call from Don King citing that he will receive a title shot after George presumably beats Muhammed Ali. However, much to Chuck's shock and dishevelment, Ali defeats Foreman in The Rumble in the Jungle. After witnessing Chuck flirting with another woman in a coffee shop, Phyllis leaves Chuck.

Al later calls Chuck and says that Don King wants him to fight Ali under the pretences of a "race thing", as Chuck was the only white boxer in the top 10 heavyweight rankings. Al subsequently takes Chuck to the Grand Hotel in upstate New York to train professionally. However, following the one-sided press conferences with Ali and negative press the fight receives, Chuck feels nervous. Phyliss eventually comes to see Chuck, and she forgives and comforts him.

Although the fight is largely one-sided, Chuck defies predictions of being knocked out in the third round, almost going the full distance against the champion and even knocking him down. Despite the loss, Wepner becomes a local hero. Though he is irritated to hear claims from Ali that Wepner's knockdown of him was due to a foot stomp, Chuck enjoys his newfound celebrity and becomes the basis of Sylvester Stallone's film Rocky. However, Chuck becomes increasingly addicted to his fame and begins taking cocaine. He subsequently becomes infatuated with female bartender Linda. Phyllis soon catches on to Wepner's unfaithful behavior and kicks him out of the house.

After engaging in a mixed wrestling/boxing match with Andre the Giant at Shea Stadium, Chuck visits his brother to celebrate the film's success, though he is unimpressed and despondent with the news, much to his disappointment. Instead, he is welcomed by Stallone after meeting him, and Chuck personally assists in the screenplay of Rocky 2. However, he botches his audition for a role as Rocky's sparring partner, leaving him devastated.

Three years later, Chuck's psyche worsens, and he is increasingly disheveled, arriving to Kimberly's parent-teach conference on cocaine. He is later arrested and imprisoned for possession of drugs with intent to sell. During his time in prison, he sees Stallone filming for his movie Lock Up. Chuck soon humbles himself and realizes that he was trying too hard to live up to his superstardom as the 'real Rocky', when he should be appreciative with who he has in his life.

After being released from prison for good behavior, he is given an unsanctioned charity bout with Victor the Wrestling Bear to make ends meet. Afterwards, he is visited by Linda, and the two become a couple.

End credits reveal that Chuck and Linda still live in Bayonne, and that he and his daughter have reconciled and speak daily.

Cast 
 Liev Schreiber as Chuck Wepner, a heavyweight boxer.
 Angel Kolev as Young Chuck Wepner 18 years old
 Naomi Watts as Linda, Wepner's third wife.
 Elisabeth Moss as Phyllis, Wepner's second wife.
 Jim Gaffigan as John Stoehr, Wepner's best friend.
 Michael Rapaport as Don Wepner, Wepner's estranged brother.
 Boyan Bankov as Young Don 18 years old
 Pooch Hall as Muhammad Ali, the heavyweight champion whose 1975 fight earned a sudden fame for Wepner.
 Morgan Spector as Sylvester Stallone, the actor-screenwriter who wrote Rocky right after the 1975 fight.
 Ron Perlman as Al Braverman, Wepner's manager and trainer who guided him to the fight with Ali.
 Kelvin Hale as Charlie Polite, Wepner's training partner for the Ali fight.
 Jason Jones as Arty
 William Hill as Paddy Flood
 Wass Stevens as Johnny Dicesare
 Sadie Sink as Kimberley
 Meld Ludwig as Young Kimberley 
 Catherine Corcoran as Sandy 
Marissa Rose Gordon as Penelope (Bikini Girl #2)

Production 

On May 10, 2011, it was announced that Jeff Feuerzeig would direct the boxing drama The Bleeder based on the script he co-wrote with Jerry Stahl, about a true story of the heavyweight boxer Chuck Wepner. Michael Tollin and Carl Hampe were attached as producers, while Linda Zander's Maxar Pictures was attached to finance the film. Christina Hendricks was previously cast in the film to play one of the lead roles. In October 2015, Liev Schreiber was confirmed to play Wepner, who always wanted to portray the role, and had been attached with the project for the last five years, and Naomi Watts was cast to play his third wife Linda Wepner. Schreiber would also produce the film along with Tollin, Hampe, Christa Campbell, and Lati Grobman, with banners Mandalay Sports Media and Campbell-Grobman Films. On October 22, 2015, Elisabeth Moss was cast in the film to play his second wife, Phyllis Wepner, who was with him when Wepner fought Muhammad Ali.

On October 30, 2015, additional cast was announced, including Jim Gaffigan as John Stoehr, Wepner's loyal friend; Michael Rapaport as Wepner's estranged brother; Pooch Hall as boxer Ali, whose 1975 fight with Wepner led to Wepner's sudden fame; and Morgan Spector as actor-screenwriter Sylvester Stallone, who wrote Rocky soon after the 1975 fight. Wepner claimed he had inspired that film's title character Rocky Balboa but Stallone has never confirmed it. On November 11, 2015, Ron Perlman signed on to play Al Braverman, Wepner's manager and trainer who guided him to the title fight with Ali. On November 11, 2015, Remstar Films acquired the Canadian distribution rights to the film.

Principal photography on the film began on October 26, 2015 in Suffern, New York, where some scenes were shot at the Lafayette Theatre. Filming ended on December 4, 2015.

Release
The film had its world premiere at the Venice Film Festival on September 2, 2016. It went onto screen at the Toronto International Film Festival on September 10, 2016. In September 2016, IFC Films and Showtime Networks acquired U.S distribution rights to the film. It will also screen at the Tribeca Film Festival in April 2017. It was released on May 5, 2017.

Critical response

On review aggregator website Rotten Tomatoes, the film has an approval rating of 81%, based on 84 reviews, with an average rating of 6.8/10. The website's critics consensus reads: "Chuck is hit with a handful of sports biopic clichés but ultimately punches above its weight, largely thanks to a muscular performance from Liev Schreiber." On Metacritic the film has a score of 68 out of 100 score, based on 29 critics, indicating "generally favorable reviews". Glenn Kenny of the NY Times found the performances favorable writing, "Liev Schreiber has almost no physical resemblance to the boxer Chuck Wepner, but he is a terrific actor who pulls off that portrayal, partly through understatement."

See also
The Brawler, another biographical film about Wepner.

References

External links 
 

2016 films
Films directed by Philippe Falardeau
Films shot in New York (state)
Films set in New York (state)
Films set in Hudson County, New Jersey
Films set in Ohio
Films set in Philadelphia
American boxing films
American biographical drama films
American sports drama films
Biographical films about sportspeople
British boxing films
2010s sports drama films
2016 biographical drama films
Drama films based on actual events
Sports films based on actual events
IFC Films films
Cultural depictions of boxers
Cultural depictions of American men
Cultural depictions of Muhammad Ali
Cultural depictions of Sylvester Stallone
Films with screenplays by Michael Cristofer
2010s English-language films
2010s American films
2010s British films